Bikaner Technical University (BTU) is a technical state university located in Bikaner, Rajasthan, India. It was established in 2017 with jurisdiction over technical institutes in Bikaner division, Jodhpur division, Nagaur district in Ajmer division and districts Alwar, Sikar and Jhunjhunu in Jaipur division, affiliating 69 engineering and management colleges which were formerly affiliated to Rajasthan Technical University.

Notable affiliated colleges 
 B.K. Birla Institute of Engineering & Technology
 Government Engineering College Bikaner
 Government Engineering College, Ajmer
 Government Mahila Engineering College
 Jodhpur Institute of Engineering and Technology
 Laxmi Devi Institute of Engineering and Technology
 Mayurakshi Institute of Engineering & Technology
 Raj Engineering College
 S.L.B.S Engineering College
 Saint Margaret Engineering College
 Modern Institute Of Technology and Research Centre

References

External links 
 

Universities and colleges in Bikaner
Universities in Rajasthan
Educational institutions established in 2013
2013 establishments in Rajasthan